"Vart jag än går" is a song recorded by Stiftelsen on their 2012 studio album Ljungaverk. In 2013, it won a Grammis  Award for "Song of the year 2012".

On 5 August 2012, it entered Svensktoppen, charting for 40 weeks before leaving the chart. It also peaked at number one on the Swedish Singles Chart.

Charts

Weekly charts

Year-end charts

References

2012 singles
2012 songs
Number-one singles in Sweden
Stiftelsen (band) songs
Swedish-language songs